Beaconsfield High School (commonly referred to as Beaconsfield High or BHS) is a secondary school located in the Montreal area suburb of Beaconsfield, Quebec, Canada. Beaconsfield High is part of The Lester B. Pearson School Board. Previously, it was considered to be the flagship high school of the now defunct Lakeshore School Board. The principal of BHS is Rachel Wilson.

First opened in 1958, and renovated and expanded in the 1970s adding a second gymnasium, theatre, new cafeteria, library and two new wings, it currently is home to more than 600 students. According to the school's website, "BHS has traditionally served the communities of Beaconsfield, Baie d'Urfe, Kirkland and Pointe Claire. Students from the communities of Ste. Anne de Bellevue, Ile Perrot and Pincourt are now increasingly part of the school population. 90% of graduating students go on to attend CEGEP or other post-secondary institutions."

Beaconsfield High School also offers strong academic French immersion and regular English programs at all levels, as well as an alternative program known as Embarkations, which is renowned for its successes with disenfranchised youth that started in 1992. Augmenting these course offerings are a wide range of special programs covering visual arts, drama, dance, music, physical education, and computer technology. Beaconsfield High School gives students access to a large variety of sports and e-sports. The school also offers many different after-school clubs including but not limited to the "Dungeons and Dragons" club, the math club, and the manga club.

References

External links
 Beaconsfield High School official site

English-language schools in Quebec
Lester B. Pearson School Board
High schools in Montreal
Beaconsfield, Quebec
Janet Leys Shaw Mactavish buildings